Edward Moukawsher (born November 1, 1952) is an American politician who served in the Connecticut House of Representatives from the 40th district from 2003 to 2015.

References

1952 births
Living people
Democratic Party members of the Connecticut House of Representatives